Juan Carlos Heredia Araya (born 1 May 1952 in Córdoba) is a former football forward. Born in Argentina, he represented the Spain national team. His father, also named Juan Carlos, was a notable forward of the 1940s that was nicknamed "Milonga" and played in Rosario Central, San Lorenzo, and the Argentina national team.

Heredia (nicknamed "Milonguita") gave his first steps on football playing for local team Universitario de Córdoba. His debut in professional football was in 1970 for his home town club Belgrano (then coached by Llamil Simes). Heredia won the Liga Cordobesa title with the club, also scoring the goal for the 1–0 v arch-rival Talleres in the final.

At nacional level, Heredia played with Belgrano the 1971 Nacional championship. His good performances on the field attracted the attention of Rosario Central, which acquired him in 1972 for AR$ 4 million. Nevertheless, he stadyed only 4 months in Rosario so that same year he was transferred to Spanish club Barcelona, which loaned him first to FC Porto and then to Elche. Nevertheless, the most remarkable era in Heredia's career was in Barcelona, where he finally debuted in 1974, staying six seasons in the club and winning two titles there.

Also in those years Heredia became Spanish national, playing three matches for the Spain national team in 1978–79. In 1980 Heredia returned to Argentine to play for River Plate, where he won two league titles. In River Plate, Heredia was injured in a Copa Libertadores match v Vélez Sarsfield when he suffer the tearing of ligaments. In 1981 he moved to Talleres de Córdoba (recommended by coach Angel Labruna), where he only played 10 minutes before leaving the field. Heredia's leg had not recovered well from surgery, forcing him to leave football definitely.

Personal life 
In an interview in 1999, Heredia said that he had earned more than USD 7 million in his career but he lost everything after giving 36 houses and 22 cars to other people. Due to his financial problems, he became a taxi driver in Córdoba.

Titles
Barcelona
 Copa del Rey (1): 1977–78
 UEFA Cup Winners' Cup (1): 1978-79

River Plate
 Primera División (2): 1980 Metropolitano, 1981 Nacional

See also
List of Spain international footballers born outside Spain

References

External links

 Sportec National team profile
 

1952 births
Living people
Footballers from Córdoba, Argentina
Spanish footballers
Spain international footballers
Argentine footballers
Argentine emigrants to Spain
Association football forwards
Club Atlético Belgrano footballers
Rosario Central footballers
FC Porto players
Elche CF players
FC Barcelona players
Club Atlético River Plate footballers
Argentinos Juniors footballers
Talleres de Córdoba footballers
Argentine Primera División players
Expatriate footballers in Portugal
Argentine expatriate sportspeople in Portugal